Gibberifera yadongensis is a species of moth of the family Tortricidae. It is found in China (Sichuan, Tibet).

References

Moths described in 1996
Eucosmini